Brad Lamb (born October 7, 1967) is a former American football wide receiver. He played for the Buffalo Bills from 1992 to 1993.

References

1967 births
Living people
American football wide receivers
Anderson Ravens football players
Buffalo Bills players